The Fiescher Glacier (Fieschergletscher in German) is a valley glacier on the south side of the Bernese Alps in the canton of Valais, Switzerland.  in length, it is the second longest glacier in the Alps.

In the lower section, the Fiescher Glacier flows south through a deep valley between the Gross Wannenhorn and the Wasenhorn. In summer, when the snow layer melts, it has a grey colour as it is covered with rocks coming from the steep slopes of the mountains around.

This glacier is not to be confused with the like-named Grindelwald-Fieschergletscher on the north of the Fiescherhörner located near Grindelwald.

See also
List of glaciers in Switzerland
List of glaciers
Retreat of glaciers since 1850
Swiss Alps

External links
Swiss glacier monitoring network

Glaciers of Valais
Glaciers of the Alps